Mavis is a feminine given name.

Mavis may also refer to:

Places
Mavis (crater), a small lunar crater
1607 Mavis, an asteroid, discovered in 1950

Surname
Andrew Mavis (born 1976), Canadian basketball player who competed in the 2000 Olympics
Eylem Elif Maviş (born 1973), first Turkish woman mountaineer to climb Mount Everest

Other uses
"Mavis", Allied codename for the World War II Japanese Kawanishi H6K flying boat
Mavis, the Old English name for the song thrush (Turdus philomelos), still used by some dialects in the UK
The Mavis's, an Australian alternative rock band
Cyclone Mavis (1965), west of Australia - see List of historical tropical cyclone names
Cyclone Mavis (1971)
Mavis Mill, a Lancashire cotton spinning mill
Empire Mavis, a British ship - see List of Empire ships (M)
Mavis Discount Tires, an American tire retailing company